Eric "Showboat" Pogue (born May 8, 1929) is a Canadian former professional hockey player who played over 300 games in the American Hockey League, spending time with the Pittsburgh Hornets, St. Louis Flyers, Syracuse Warriors, Cleveland Barons and Buffalo Bisons. He also played in the International Hockey League for the Huntington Hornets and Fort Wayne Komets.

External links
 

1929 births
Living people
Canadian ice hockey right wingers
Huntington Hornets players
Pittsburgh Hornets players
St. Louis Flyers players
Calgary Stampeders (ice hockey) players
Ice hockey people from Ontario